Ascription, in sociology, is a way to acquire status, along with achievement or chance.
In philosophy, it is related to belief ascription.

It is also a concept in linguistics, refer to Predicate (grammar).

See also
 Ascriptive inequality

References

External links 

Sociological terminology